Niconiades is a genus of skipper butterflies in the family Hesperiidae.

Species
Recognised species in the genus Niconiades include:
 Niconiades comitana Freeman, 1969
 Niconiades cydia (Hewitson, 1876)
 Niconiades derisor (Mabille, 1891)
 Niconiades merenda (Mabille, 1878)
 Niconiades peri (Evans, 1955)
 Niconiades viridis (Bell, 1930)
 Niconiades xanthaphes Hübner, [1821]

References

Natural History Museum Lepidoptera genus database

Hesperiinae
Hesperiidae genera